Vadim Viktorovich Shmelyov (born August 30, 1967) is a Russian film director, screenwriter and producer.

Biography
Vadim was born on August 30, 1967. He studied at Russian State Institute of Performing Arts as a drama director (1990-1995).

Filmography (selected)
 Moscow Mission (2006)
 The Apocalypse Code (2007)
 S. S. D. (2008)
 The Last Frontier (2020)

References

External links 
 
 Vadim Shmelyov on kino-teatr.ru

Living people
Russian film directors
1967 births
People from Aleksinsky District